Matharu or Matharoo is an Jatt surname.

People with this name include: 

Ajaip Singh Matharu (born 1938),  Ugandan hockey player
Inderjit Singh Matharu (born 1969), Kenyan hockey player
Jeet Matharu, Indian film director
Kiran Matharu (born 1989), British golfer
Santokh Singh Matharu (1942–2011), Kenyan hockey player

Indian surnames